Pentagonia macrophylla is a species of flowering plant in the family Rubiaceae, native from south-eastern Nicaragua to Ecuador. It was first described by George Bentham in 1844.

References

Flora of Colombia
Flora of Costa Rica
Flora of Ecuador
Flora of Nicaragua
Flora of Panama
macrophylla
Plants described in 1844
Taxonomy articles created by Polbot